Javier Frana and Jim Pugh were the defending champions, but Frana did not compete this year.

Pugh teamed up with Patrick Galbraith and successfully defended his title, by defeating Francisco Montana and David Wheaton 7–6, 7–6 in the final.

Seeds

Draw

Draw

References

External links
 Official results archive (ATP)
 Official results archive (ITF)

Los Angeles Open (tennis)
1992 ATP Tour
Volvo Tennis Los Angeles
Volvo Tennis Los Angeles